Bloom is the third studio album released by Audio Adrenaline. In 1999, the album was certified Gold by RIAA.

Concept 

Bloom represented a departure from the band's previous efforts into a more straightforward rock with hints of grunge music. According to the band, both the title and the music reflects the way they've matured and "grown into a new phase of life".

Recording 

Bloom was recorded in 1995 at various studios in Tennessee: Ardent Recordings in Memphis, The Salt Mine in Brentwood, and House of Insomnia in Franklin. Producer, John Hampton, was in charge of the recording and mixing. The mastering was done by Ken Love at MasterMix, Nashville, Tennessee.

Critical reception 

Bloom was well received by the audience becoming the first album of the band to be certified gold by RIAA. John DiBiase, of Jesus Freak Hideout, gave the album 4.5 stars out of 5, calling it "a brave and risky album for the band that only proved to be an ultimately wise stylistic change... it's among their best, and a dang good 90's rock album." Paul Portell, also of Jesus Freak Hideout, gave it 3.5 stars out of 5, and wrote that the album "showed Audio A's growth and potential... No 90's Christian rock fan should be without this monumental project." Sherwin Frias, of Jesus Freak Hideout too, praised the band's improved songwriting and called the album "fantastic" and "essential for any AudioA fan".

Commercial performance 

The album peaked at No. 77 on Billboard 200.

Track listing 

  appears on Hit Parade
  appears on Adios: The Greatest Hits

Personnel 

Audio Adrenaline
 Mark Stuart – lead vocals
 Will McGinniss – bass, vocals
 Bob Herdman – guitar, keyboards, vocals
 Barry Blair – guitar, vocals

Additional musicians
 Jason Halbert – Moog synthesizer (7)
 Greg Herrington – drums
 Todd Collins – percussion montage, backing vocals
 John Hampton – percussion montage
 Ben Cissell – percussion montage
 Eddie DeGarmo – keyboard arrangements

Production
 John Hampton – producer, engineer, mixing at Ardent Recordings, Memphis, Tennessee
 The Gotee Brothers – producers
 Eddie DeGarmo – executive producer
 Dan R. Brock – executive producer
 Erick Flettrich – engineer
 John Painter – engineer
 Jef Curtiss – engineer
 Todd Collins – additional engineering on "See Through"
 Reid Waltz – additional engineering on "See Through"
 Ken Love – mastering at Master Mix, Nashville, Tennessee
 John Falls – photography
 Rusty Rust – aluminum photography
 Kerri McKeehan Stuart – art direction
 Brad Talbott – design

References 

1996 albums
Audio Adrenaline albums
ForeFront Records albums